Paradas Contínuas ( literally "Stop and Go") is a 2009 Mexican comedy film directed by Gustavo Loza and Germán Valdés III, Luis Arrieta and Cassandra Ciangherotti. The film is based on "Rapiditos Motorizados", an original story by Juan Meyer. The screenplay is by Meyer, adapted by Loza.

Plot
Perico and Emilio are two students who have nowhere to have sex with their girlfriends.  They cannot take them home, and don't want to go to a hotel, so they use Perico's father's cherished VW microbus after making some changes to it.  They then decide to go into business with the van.

Cast
Germán Valdés III as Perico
Luis Arrieta as Emilio
Cassandra Ciangherotti as Lisa
Ana Karina Sanchez as Federica
Jimena Guerra as Karina
Ilithya Manzanilla as Dara
Alejandro Calva as Master Carranco
Tia Regina Orozco as Roz
Silverio Palacios as Cachacuaz
Luz María Zetina as Luisa
Javier Gurruchaga as Teacher Goicoechea
Daniel Martinez as Perico Dad
Oswaldo Zarate as Ramiro
Alejandro de la Vega as Tino
Damayanti Quintanar as Sasha
Anhuar Escalante as Dino
Sergio Ochoa as Rogelio
Wanda Seux as Wanda

Soundtrack

 "Yofo" - Molotov
 "Encuerado" - Babasónicos 
 "Amar y vivir" - Tonino Carotone
 "Mil Demonios" -  Moderatto 
 "Susie Q" - Orquesta Mondragón
 "Funkytown" - Lipps Inc. 
 "Chambacu" - Aurita Castillo y su conjunto
 "Monitor" - Volován featuring Ximena Sariñana 
 "Sufro por ti" - Los Gatos
 "Lolita" - Orquesta Mondragón
 "Compagnon Du Ciel" - Adanowsky and Arthur H 
 "Cantando en el baño" - Germán Valdés “Tin Tan” 
 "Quizás, Quizás, Quizás" - Sarita Montiel 
 "Memories Through Your Eyes" - Los Charlone Y Juan Adolfo Moreno 
 "Tu amor mata" - Juguete Rabioso 
 "Bang" - Veo Muertos featuring Diego Maroto 
 "Se Me Perdió La Cadenita" - La Sonora Dinamita 
 "Sin Amigos" - Los Mentas
 "Sastre del Diablo" - Babasónicos

External links

2009 films
Mexican comedy films
2000s Mexican films